This is a list of ambassadors of the United States to Hungary.

Until 1867 Hungary had been part of the Austrian Empire, when the empire became Austria-Hungary. Hungary had no separate diplomatic relations with other nations. The United States had diplomatic relations with the empire and Austria-Hungary through the legation in Vienna.

The empire was dissolved following World War I, and the United States established separate diplomatic relations with Austria and Hungary in 1921, reopening the embassy in Vienna and establishing a legation in Budapest. Ulysses Grant-Smith opened the U.S. legation on December 26, 1921, and remained the chief of mission as chargé d'affaires until an ambassador was commissioned the following year.

For ambassadors to Austria-Hungary prior to the dissolution of the empire, see United States Ambassador to Austria.

The United States Embassy in Hungary is located on Szabadság tér (Liberty Square) in the Pest part of Budapest.

Ambassadors

Notes

References

See also
 — Photographs of U.S. Ambassadors to Hungary 1941–2001 (PDF)
Hungary – United States relations
Foreign relations of Hungary
Ambassadors of the United States

References
United States Department of State: Background notes on Hungary

External links
 United States Department of State: Chiefs of Mission for Hungary
 United States Department of State: Hungary
 United States Embassy in Budapest

Hungary

Lists of ambassadors to Hungary